Moirangthem Inao is a noted Indian playwright, lyricist, producer and director from Imphal, Manipur. He has scripted around 90 plays and most of them are popular radio plays aired on All India Radio, Imphal. Inao has also directed famous Manipuri movies like Nongallabasu Thaballei Manam and Laang. The dialogues from his radio plays have a unique charm and are famous among the radio play lovers of Manipur.

Inao was an editor of the journal Athouba. He produced movies under his home production Tondon Films. He bagged the Best Story and Special Jury awards at the 3rd Sahitya Seva Samiti MANIFA 2014 for the film Abem.

Early life and education
Born as youngest son among seven siblings, Inao began his schooling from Uripok Boys' School and Uripok Eigya Pishak Mandav school where he studied from I to VIII standard. In 1963, he passed Matriculation from Tombisana High School. He completed graduation from D.M. College in Political Science in 1967. He studied Law for sometime but could not complete the course due to some personal problems. After passing graduation, he went to Kashmir for further studies  in 1971 but returned home without completing studies. Finally, he completed master's degree from Manipur University in Manipuri. His family shifted to Uripok Ningthoukhongjam Leikai during Second World War, locally known as Japan Laan in Manipur.

Career
He started writing poetry and short stories since his IX standard. He started scripting radio plays for All India Radio in June-July 1978. His first radio play is Ahing Ama. Most of his plays aired on All India Radio, Imphal are well received by the radio listeners of Manipur. Among them, Chatledo Eidi Meigee Ching Puduna, Nongallabasu Thaballei Manam, Anuradhapur Ashramgee Rajkumar, Ingengi Aitya may be mentioned. His radio play Marup Ani was translated into Hindi and aired on Akashvani All India Radio as Do Dost.

His radio play Chatledo Eidi Meigee Ching Puduna was made into a movie by Makhonmani Mongsaba and titled as Chatledo Eidi. It won the National Film Award for Best Feature Film in Manipuri at the 48th National Film Awards and was selected for Indian Panorama of IFFI 2001. Makhonmani Mongsaba also directed Yenning Amadi Likla, a 2007 movie and scripted by Moirangthem Inao. It got selection in Indian Panorama of the 39th International Film Festival of India 2008. The renowned filmmakers of Manipur have also made many feature films scripted by Inao. Ingengi Atiya, Lallibadi Eini, Angangba Kurao Mapal, Inga Nonglakta, Kekoo Lotpee and Pankhei are such of his films.

As of 2016, he scripted a movie named as Pakhatli.

Selected radio plays

 Ahing Ama
 Thengnakhidraba Mikup
 Tamnaba
 Nongallabasu Thaballei Manam
 Chatledo Eidi Meigee Ching Puduna
 Ingengi Atiya
 Lam Nganu
 Aong Aoon
 Khongul
 Ashi Heibong
 Anuradhapur Ashramgee Rajkumar
 Ekai Hangoidana Hairaba Ekum Thani Go! Go!
 Nungaiba
 Nirupama
 Yaroi Yaroi
 Bonsai
 Keidoungei Loigani Imunggi Lanjao

Selected filmography

References

Writers from Manipur
20th-century Indian writers
Living people
People from Imphal
Indian male writers
20th-century Indian male writers
1945 births